The Bács Kiskun County Assembly is the local legislative body of Bács-Kiskun County in the Southern Great Plain, in Hungary.

Composition

2019
The Assembly elected at the 2019 local government elections, is made up of 23 counselors,  with the following party composition:

|-
|colspan=8 align=center| 
|-
! colspan="2" | Party
! Votes
! %
! +/-
! Seats 
! +/-
! Seats %
|-
| bgcolor=| 
| align=left | Fidesz–KDNP
| align=right| 87,225
| align=right| 60.42
| align=right| 4.68
| align=right| 16
| align=right| 2
| align=right| 69.57
|-
| bgcolor=| 
| align=left | Momentum Movement (Momentum)
| align=right| 14,999
| align=right| 10.39
| align=right| 
| align=right| 2
| align=right| 2
| align=right| 8.70
|-
| bgcolor=| 
| align=left | Democratic Coalition (DK)
| align=right| 13,877
| align=right| 9.61
| align=right| 3.70
| align=right| 2
| align=right| 1
| align=right| 8.70
|-
| bgcolor=| 
| align=left | Jobbik
| align=right| 13,845
| align=right| 9.59
| align=right| 10.62
| align=right| 2
| align=right| 3
| align=right| 8.70
|-
| bgcolor=| 
| align=left | Our Homeland Movement (Mi Hazánk)
| align=right| 7,915
| align=right| 5.48
| align=right| 
| align=right| 1
| align=right| 1
| align=right| 4.35
|-
! colspan=8|
|-
| bgcolor=| 
| align=left | Hungarian Socialist Party (MSZP)
| align=right| 6,507
| align=right| 4.51
| align=right| 7.49
| align=right| 0
| align=right| 3
| align=right| 0
|-
! align=right colspan=2| Total
! align=right| 149,401
! align=right| 100.0
! align=right| 
! align=right| 23
! align=right| 1
! align=right| 
|-
! align=right colspan=2| Voter turnout
! align=right| 
! align=right| 44.54
! align=right| 1.38
! align=right| 
! align=right| 
! align=right| 
|}

After the elections in 2019 the Assembly controlled by Fidesz–KDNP party alliance which has 16 councillors, versus 2 for Jobbik, 2 for the Democratic Coalition (DK),  2 for the Momentum Movement and 1 for Our Homeland Movement (Mi Hazánk) councillors.

2014
The Assembly elected at the 2014 local government elections, is made up of 24 counselors, with the following party composition:

|-
! colspan="2" | Party
! Votes
! %
! +/-
! Seats 
! +/-
! Seats %
|-
| bgcolor=| 
| align=left | Fidesz–KDNP
| align=right| 79,721
| align=right| 55.74
| align=right| 7.65
| align=right| 14
| align=right| 2
| align=right| 58.33
|-
| bgcolor=| 
| align=left | Jobbik
| align=right| 28,911
| align=right| 20.21
| align=right| 6.50
| align=right| 5
| align=right| 2
| align=right| 20.83
|-
| bgcolor=| 
| align=left | Hungarian Socialist Party (MSZP)
| align=right| 18,024
| align=right| 12.60
| align=right| 4.91
| align=right| 3
| align=right| 1
| align=right| 12.50
|-
| bgcolor=| 
| align=left | Democratic Coalition (DK)
| align=right| 8,458
| align=right| 5.91
| align=right| 
| align=right| 1
| align=right| 1
| align=right| 4.17
|-
| bgcolor=| 
| align=left | Politics Can Be Different (LMP)
| align=right| 7,908
| align=right| 5.53
| align=right| 0.13
| align=right| 1
| align=right| 0
| align=right| 4.17
|-
! align=right colspan=2| Total
! align=right| 148,713
! align=right| 100.0
! align=right| 
! align=right| 24
! align=right| 0
! align=right| 
|-
! align=right colspan=2| Voter turnout
! align=right| 
! align=right| 43.16
! align=right| 2.11
! align=right| 
! align=right| 
! align=right| 
|}

After the elections in 2014 the Assembly controlled by the Fidesz–KDNP party alliance which has 16 councillors, versus 5 Jobbik, 3 Hungarian Socialist Party (MSZP), 1 Democratic Coalition (DK) and 1 Politics Can Be Different (LMP) councillors.

2010
The Assembly elected at the 2010 local government elections, is made up of 24 counselors, with the following party composition:

|-
! colspan="2" | Party
! Votes
! %
! +/-
! Seats 
! +/-
! Seats %
|-
| bgcolor=| 
| align=left | Fidesz–KDNP
| align=right| 96,203
| align=right| 63.39
| align=right| .
| align=right| 16
| align=right| 12
| align=right| 66.67
|-
| bgcolor=| 
| align=left | Hungarian Socialist Party (MSZP)
| align=right| 25,569
| align=right| 17.51
| align=right| .
| align=right| 4
| align=right| 10
| align=right| 16.67
|-
| bgcolor=| 
| align=left | Jobbik
| align=right| 20,814
| align=right| 13.71
| align=right| 
| align=right| 3
| align=right| 3
| align=right| 12.50
|-
| bgcolor=| 
| align=left | Politics Can Be Different (LMP)
| align=right| 8,189
| align=right| 5.40
| align=right| 
| align=right| 1
| align=right| 1
| align=right| 4.17
|-
! align=right colspan=2| Total
! align=right| 157,348
! align=right| 100.0
! align=right| 
! align=right| 24
! align=right| 22
! align=right| 
|-
! align=right colspan=2| Voter turnout
! align=right| 
! align=right| 45.27
! align=right| 
! align=right| 
! align=right| 
! align=right| 
|}

After the elections in 2010 the Assembly controlled by the Fidesz–KDNP party alliance which has 16 councillors, versus 4 Hungarian Socialist Party (MSZP), 3 Jobbik and 1 Politics Can Be Different (LMP) councillors.

Presidents of the Assembly
So far, the presidents of the Bács-Kiskun County Assembly have been:

 1990–1994 Mihály Kőtörő, Alliance of Free Democrats (SZDSZ)
 1994–1998 László Balogh, Hungarian Socialist Party (MSZP)
 1998–2002 Sándor Endre, Fidesz–MDF
 2002–2006 László Balogh, Hungarian Socialist Party (MSZP)
 2006–2014 Gábor Bányai, Fidesz–KDNP
 since 2014 László Rideg, Fidesz–KDNP

References

Local government in Hungary
Bács-Kiskun County